James Fitz Randolph (June 26, 1791 – January 25, 1872) was a United States representative from New Jersey. He was also the father of Theodore Fitz Randolph.  Born in Middlesex County, New Jersey, he received a limited schooling.

Randolph learned the printing trade and edited the New Brunswick Fredonian 1812–1842. He served as the United States collector of internal revenue 1815-1846 and clerk of the Court of Common Pleas. He was a member of the New Jersey General Assembly in 1823 and 1824.

Randolph was elected as an Adams candidate to the Twentieth Congress to fill the vacancy caused by the death of George Holcombe. He was reelected as an Anti-Jacksonian to the Twenty-first and Twenty-second Congresses and served in office from December 1, 1828, to March 3, 1833. After Congress, he served as president of a bank in New Brunswick, New Jersey. He died in Easton, Pennsylvania in 1872 and was buried in Easton Cemetery.

External links

James Fitz Randolph at The Political Graveyard

1791 births
1872 deaths
Members of the New Jersey General Assembly
Politicians from New Brunswick, New Jersey
National Republican Party members of the United States House of Representatives from New Jersey